Thomas Graham, 1st Baron Lynedoch  (19 October 174818 December 1843) was a Scottish aristocrat, politician and British Army officer. After his education at Oxford, he inherited a substantial estate in Scotland, married and settled down to a quiet career as a landowning gentleman. However, with the death of his wife, when he was aged 42, he immersed himself in a military (and later political) career, during the French Revolutionary Wars and the Napoleonic Wars.

Taylor described Graham as "tall, square-shouldered, and erect, his limbs sinewy and remarkably strong. His complexion was dark, with full eyebrows, firm-set lips, and an open, benevolent air. His manners and address were frank, simple, and polished".

Early life and education
Thomas Graham was the third and only surviving son of Thomas Græme of Balgowan, in Perthshire and Lady Christian Hope, a daughter of the first Earl of Hopetoun. He was born in 1748, and was educated at home by the Reverend Fraser, minister of Moneydie, and afterwards by James Macpherson, the collector and translator of Ossian's poems. He went up to Christ Church, Oxford in 1766, and the following year he inherited the family estate following the death of his father.

On leaving college, he spent several years on the Continent, where he learnt French, German and Spanish. On his return to Scotland he applied himself to the management and improvement of his estate, enclosing his lands, erecting farmhouses and offices, granting leases to his tenants, encouraging them to implement improved methods of husbandry, and to cultivate potatoes and turnips on a large scale, which had hitherto been regarded as garden plants. He also set himself to cultivate improved breeds of horses, cattle, and sheep.

In 1785, he purchased the estate of Lynedoch or Lednock, situated in the valley of the Almond, where he planted trees and oak coppices, and improved the sloping banks bordering the stream. Fond of horses and dogs, and distinguished for his skill in country sports, he rode with the foxhounds, and accompanied the Duke of Atholl—who subsequently became his brother-in-law—in grouse-shooting and deer-stalking on the Atholl moors. He later said that he owed much of that education of the eye with reference to ground and distances, a useful talent for a military man, to his deer-hunting at this period of his life in the Forest of Atholl.

Early political career and marriage

In a 1772 by-election, Graham stood as a Whig a candidate for Perth, in opposition to James Murray of Strowan, brother of the Duke of Atholl, but was defeated by a majority of only six votes out of 100. He remained active in the political field but withdrew shortly before the general election of 1774, having become engaged to the Honorable Mary Cathcart, second daughter of the 9th Lord Cathcart, whose sister was betrothed to the 3rd Duke of Atholl's son and heir.

Two years later in 1774 he married Mary and on the same day her elder sister became Duchess of Atholl. "Jane," wrote Lord Cathcart, "has married, to please herself, John, Duke of Atholl, a peer of the realm; Mary has married Thomas Graham of Balgowan, the man of her heart, and a peer among princes."

Her portrait by Thomas Gainsborough was highly acclaimed when exhibited at the Royal Academy in 1777. The painting Portrait of Mrs Mary Graham was covered over by Graham after her death. The painting now hangs in the National Galleries of Scotland, Edinburgh.

Graham spent the next eighteen years as a quiet country gentleman, spending his time on riding and sports, studying the classics and making occasional visits to London and Edinburgh. When his carriage was stopped in Park Lane, London by a highwayman demanding money, jewels, and watches at gunpoint, while two accomplices seized the horses' heads, Graham, who was on the opposite side of the carriage, leapt across the ladies to the carriage-door, and collaring the assailant, threw him to the ground. Then, drawing his sword, which at the time formed part of a dress suit, he threatened to run the man through if his associates, who were holding the horses' heads, attempted to come to his assistance. They immediately fled, and the prostrate highwayman was arrested.

Death of his wife

Mary Graham's health began to decline, and in the spring of 1792, on the recommendation of her medical adviser, she went to the south of France with her husband and sister. However, during the voyage she died off the coast near Hyères, France, on 26June 1792. Her sorrowing husband hired a barge to take the casket to Bordeaux but near Toulouse a group of French soldiers opened the coffin and disturbed the body. He closed the casket and returned home to deposit her remains in a mausoleum, which he built in the churchyard of Methven. Graham would himself be laid in the same tomb fifty years later.

Mary Graham is commemorated in a four-part Scottish fiddle tune composed in her honor, entitled "The Honourable Mrs. Graham of Balgowan."

The loss of his wife preyed deeply upon Graham's mind, and first he set out for twelve months of foreign travel. However, still overwhelmed by great sorrow, and now in his forty-third year, he tried to drown the thought of his loss by adopting a military career. Before the incident with Mary's coffin near Toulouse, Graham had sympathised with the French and their revolutionary ideals but from that point on he detested them and saw his military career as a way to take revenge.

Sir Walter Scott, in his The Vision of Don Roderick, refers to the romantic motive which led the grieving husband of Mrs. Graham to devote himself to a military career:

Career

Defence of Toulon
In early 1793 he wrote to Charles O'Hara, seeking passage to Gibraltar, of which the latter was lieutenant-governor and sailed aboard the Resistance with Lord St Helens, ambassador to Spain. After France declared war on Great Britain and the Dutch Republic on 1February 1793, the British fleet under Admiral Samuel Hood assembled at Gibraltar. On his arrival there, Graham volunteered and went with the navy to Toulon, where he acted as aide-de-camp to Lord Mulgrave and fought in the defence of the town. According to Sir Gilbert Elliot, Graham "left the highest character possible both for understanding and courage".

At Toulon, Graham distinguished himself by his courage and energy: for instance, on one occasion, when a private soldier was killed, Graham snatched up his musket and took his place at the head of the attacking column. In a general order referring to the repulse of an attack by the French on an important fort, Mulgrave expressed "his grateful sense of the friendly and important assistance which he had received in many difficult moments from Mr. Graham, and to add his tribute of praise to the general voice of the British and Piedmontese officers of his column, who saw with so much pleasure and applause the gallant example which Mr. Graham set to the whole column, in the foremost point of every attack".

It was also at Toulon that Graham first became acquainted with his lifelong friend, Rowland Hill, then a captain, who ultimately became Viscount Hill, and commander-in chief of the British army.

Campaign of 1796 and return to Parliament
After returning home in November 1793, with the support of Henry Dundas, Secretary of State for War, who had married his first cousin the previous year, he was given the temporary rank of lieutenant-colonel and raised the first battalion of the 90th Regiment of Foot (Perthshire Volunteers), (Balgowan's 'Grey Breeks,' as they were called), although the addition of a second battalion was to put significant pressure on his finances. Rowland Hill became a major in the regiment, which was first deployed as part of the 1795 Quiberon Expedition. The following year they were dispatched to support the French Royalist Lieutenant-general François de Charette in his struggle with the Republicans.

In late 1795 the regiment went to Gibraltar on garrison duty, a role Graham soon tired of. He obtained permission to join the Austrian army on the Rhine as British Commissioner. In this capacity he shared in the disastrous campaign of 1796, and afterward assisted Wurmser in the defence of Mantua, when it was besieged by the French under Napoleon. The garrison was reduced to the greatest extremities from want of provisions, and Graham undertook the perilous duty of conveying intelligence to the Imperial General Alvinzi, at Bassano,  distant, of their desperate situation.

He left the fortress wearing a country cloak over his uniform and on 24December, amid rain and sleet, he crossed the Mincio in a boat that was repeatedly stranded due to the darkness. He travelled by foot during the night, wading through deep swamps, and crossing numerous watercourses and the Po, in constant danger of losing his way, or of being shot by the French pickets. At daybreak he concealed himself until nightfall, when he resumed his journey. After surmounting numerous hardships and perils, he at length reached in safety, on 4January, the headquarters of the Austrian general. However, on the 14th the Austrians were defeated and soon after Mantua was forced to surrender.

On the political front, with the support of the Duke of Atholl, in 1796 he was returned to parliament unchallenged, despite Dundas' wishing to secure the seat for his own son. Graham insisted that Atholl's support had no effect on his independence and he later wrote that at the time he remained firmly in support of the war but "at the same time never to abandon those Whig principles which had brought about the revolution of 1688."

1797–1806

Colonel Graham now returned to Scotland, but in the autumn of 1797 he rejoined his regiment at Gibraltar. In the following year he took part, under Sir Charles Stuart, in the capture of Minorca, where he greatly distinguished himself.

He then repaired to Sicily, and obtained the warmest acknowledgements of the King and Queen of Naples for his effective exertions on their behalf. In 1798 he was entrusted with the charge of the operations against the important island of Malta, which was at that time in the possession of the French. With the local rank of brigadier-general, he had under his command the 30th and 89th Regiments of foot, Alexander Hamilton as his Brigade Major and some corps embodied under his immediate direction.

Owing to the great strength of the island, he was obliged to resort to a blockade, and after a siege lasting nearly two years, the garrison were compelled by famine to surrender in September 1800. Thereafter the island remained an important part of the British Empire until it achieved independence in 1964. Colonel Graham's services were very shabbily acknowledged by the Government of that day, who reserved their patronage and honours for the officers belonging to their own political party.

In the summer of 1801 he proceeded to Egypt, where his regiment (the 90th) had greatly distinguished itself under Sir Ralph Abercromby, but he did not arrive until the campaign had terminated by the capitulation of the French army. He availed himself of the opportunity, however, to make a tour in that country and in Turkey. He spent some time in Constantinople, whence he travelled on horseback to Vienna—a journey which in later years he used to mention as one of the most agreeable rides he had ever enjoyed.

1807
After spending some time in the discharge of his parliamentary duties, and in attending to the improvement of his estates, Colonel Graham was stationed with his regiment in Ireland, and was then sent to the West Indies, where he remained for three years. When the Ministry of "All the Talents" was dismissed in 1807, on account of the favour they had shown for the Roman Catholic claims to equal privileges, Colonel Graham supported their policy, and denounced as hypocrisy the cry of "No Popery" raised by Mr. Perceval. But his approval of the proceedings of the Whig Ministry, and of Roman Catholic emancipation did not find favour with the Perthshire electors—a small body in those days—and on the dissolution of Parliament in May 1807, Colonel Graham declined to seek re-election, and Lord James Murray was returned without opposition in his stead.

1808
In 1808 Colonel Graham accompanied Sir John Moore as his aide-de-camp to Sweden, and then to Spain. He served with Moore throughout the whole of his campaign, terminating in the arduous and trying retreat to Corunna, in which Graham's services were especially valuable to the harassed troops. As Sheridan said in the House of Commons, "In the hour of peril Graham was their best adviser; in the hour of disaster Graham was their surest consolation".

When Sir John Moore received his death-wound at the battle of Corunna, Colonel Graham was at his right hand, and had his left hand on the mane of Sir John's horse. He at once rode away for medical assistance. Before he returned his dying general missed him, and anxiously asked, "Are Colonel Graham and my aides-de-camp safe?"—one of his last inquiries. Moore's body was carried to Colonel Graham's quarters, and Graham was one of the select company who witnessed Moore's burial on the rampart of the citadel of Corunna.

1809–11

After his return to England, Colonel Graham was promoted to the rank of major general, and was appointed, in the summer of 1809, to command a division under Lord Chatham, in the fatal Walcheren expedition. An attack of malaria fever, however, compelled him to return home.

On his recovery he was raised to the rank of lieutenant general, and was sent to Spain, to take command of the British and Portuguese troops in Cádiz, which was at that time closely invested by the French. The British Government attached great importance to the possession of Cádiz, as it was Britain's last stronghold in the Iberian Peninsula. But, as William Napier remarked, while "money, troops, and a fleet—in fine, all things necessary to render Cádiz formidable—were collected, yet to little purpose, because procrastinating jealousy, ostentation, and a thousand absurdities, were the invariable attendants of Spanish armies and government".

General Graham resolved to make an effort to raise the siege by attacking the rear of the besieging army, and in February 1811, he sailed from Cádiz with a force of upwards of 4,000 men, accompanied by 7,000 Spanish troops, under General La Pena, to whom, for the sake of unanimity, the chief command was conceded. The allied troops assembled at Tarifa, in the Straits of Gibraltar, and, moving northward, they arrived, on the morning of 5 March, at the heights of Barrosa, which were on the south of Cádiz and of the lines of the besieging army.

On the instructions of the Spanish general, Graham's force moved down from the position of Barossa to that of the Torre de Bermeja, about half-way to the Santi Petri river, in order to secure the communication across that river. While marching through the wood towards the Bermeja, Graham received notice that the enemy was advancing in force towards the height of Barrosa. As that position was the key of that of Santi Petri, Graham immediately countermarched, in order to support the troops left for its defence; but before the British force could get themselves quite disengaged from the wood, he saw to his astonishment the Spanish troops under La Pena abandoning the Barrosa hill, which the French left wing was rapidly ascending.

At the same time their right wing stood in the plain on the edge of the wood, within cannon-shot. "A retreat," as he says, "in the face of such an enemy, already within reach of the easy communication by the sea-beach, must have involved the whole allied army in all the danger of being attacked during the unavoidable confusion of the different corps arriving on the narrow ridge of the Bermeja at the same time. Trusting", as he says, "to the known heroism of British troops, regardless of the numbers and position of the enemy", General Graham determined on an immediate attack.

In the centre a powerful battery of ten guns, under Major Duncan, opened a most destructive fire upon General Leval's division, which, however, continued to advance in very imposing masses, but was completely defeated by a determined charge of the British left wing; and the eagle of the 8th regiment of light infantry, and a howitzer, were captured by the British. A reserve formed up beyond the narrow valley, across which the French were closely pursued, were the next to share the same fate. Meanwhile, the right wing was no less successful. The French General Ruffin's division, confident of success, met it on the ascent of the hill, and, after a sanguinary conflict, was driven from the heights in confusion, leaving two pieces of cannon in the hands of the British.

"No expressions of mine", said General Graham, in his despatch to the Secretary of State for War and the Colonies, the Earl of Liverpool, "could do justice to the conduct of the troops throughout. Nothing less than the almost unparalleled exertions of every officer, the invincible bravery of every soldier, and the most determined devotion to the honour of his Majesty's arms in all, could have achieved this brilliant success against such a formidable enemy so posted".

"The contemptible feebleness of La Pena", according to William Napier, "furnished a surprising contrast to the heroic vigour of Graham, whose attack was an inspiration rather than a resolution—so sure, so sudden was the decision, so swift, so conclusive was the execution".

The French lost about three thousand men in this action, and six pieces of cannon and an eagle were captured, along with nearly five hundred prisoners, among whom were Generals Ruffin and Rosseau. The loss on the side of the victors was two hundred killed, and upwards of nine hundred were wounded. Had it not been for the actions of the Spanish general, the victory might have had the effect of raising the blockade of Cádiz. "Had the whole body of the Spanish cavalry", wrote Graham, "with the horse artillery, been rapidly sent by the sea-beach to form on the plain, and to envelop the enemy's left; had the greatest part of the infantry been marched through the pine wood to the rear of the British force, to turn his right, he must either have retired instantly, or he would have exposed himself to absolute destruction; his cavalry greatly encumbered, his artillery lost, his columns mixed and in confusion; and a general dispersion would have been the inevitable consequence of a close pursuit. But the movement was lost".

Lord Wellington, in a dispatch to General Graham, says "I beg to congratulate you and the brave troops under your command on the signal victory which you gained on the 5th instant. I have no doubt whatever that their success would have had the effect of raising the siege of Cádiz, if the Spanish troops had made any effort to assist them; and I am equally certain, from your account of the ground, that if you had not decided with the utmost promptitude to attack the enemy, and if your attack had not been a most vigorous one, the whole allied army would have been lost".

The Spanish general, in order to screen himself from criticism, circulated less damning accounts of his own role in the battle, which General Graham refuted by publishing in Spanish, as well as in English, his dispatch to Lord Liverpool, along with a letter to the British envoy, in vindication of his conduct. Lord Wellington mentions that La Pena was to be brought to a court-martial, where he was acquitted but stripped of command. The Cortes voted to General Graham the title of grandee of the first class; he, however, declined the honour. For his brilliant victory at the Battle of Barrosa he received the thanks of Parliament, in his place as a member of the House of Commons.

1812
Shortly afterwards Graham joined the army under Wellington, and was appointed second in command. In January 1812, he took part in the siege and capture of Ciudad Rodrigo, and Wellington declared that he was much indebted to him for the success of the enterprise. Three months later he and his friend General Hill received the Order of the Bath. A problem with his eyes, from which he had been suffering for some time, made it necessary for Graham to return home at this juncture.

"I cannot avoid feeling the utmost concern," wrote Wellington to him, "that this necessity should have become urgent at this moment, and that I should now be deprived of your valuable assistance".

At the general election in October 1812, Graham contested the county of Perth with Mr. Drummond (afterwards Viscount of Strathallan), but though he was supported by a number of influential Tories, he lost the election by seven votes.

1813
His visit to Scotland had the effect of restoring his eyesight, and in May 1813, he rejoined the army at Frinada, on the frontiers of Portugal, bringing with him the insignia of the Order of the Garter to Lord Wellington. On 22May the British force quit Portugal and moved upon Vitoria in three divisions. The left wing, which was commanded by Sir Thomas Graham, had to cross three large rivers—the Douro, the Esla, and the Ebro—and had to force positions of great strength among the passes of the mountains, continually pressing round the right wing of the retiring French army. General Graham took a prominent part in the battle of Vitoria (21 June), when the French were beaten "before the town, in the town, about the town, and out of the town"; and, by carrying the villages of Gamarra and Abechuco at the point of the bayonet, he intercepted the retreat of the enemy by the high road to Bayonne, and compelled them to turn to that leading to Pampeluna.

He was shortly after directed to conduct the siege of the strong fortress of San Sebastian, which was defended with great gallantry and skill by General Rey. The first assault, which took place on 25 July, was repulsed with heavy loss, and the siege had in consequence to be raised for a time. It was renewed, however, after the defeat of Marshall Soult in the battles of the Pyrenees, and a second attempt to carry the fortress by storm was made on 31August. The breach was found to present almost insuperable obstacles, and the storming party strove in vain to effect a lodgement. In this almost desperate state of the attack, General Graham ordered a heavy fire of artillery to be directed against the curtain wall, passing only a few feet over the heads of the British troops in the breach. This novel expedient was completely successful. Taking advantage of an explosion on the rampart caused by the fire of the guns, which created confusion among the enemy, the assailants gained a footing on the wall, and after a bloody struggle, which lasted two hours, forced their way into the town.

On 31August the French troops were forced to retreat from the town to their stronghold on the hill and fortress Urgull. When it seemed that damage to the town and its dwellers was limited, many of the allied rank-and-file as evidenced by local witnesses went on a rampage spree, taking to killing (estimated 1,000 civilians), looting, raping the women and burning almost the whole town to the ground, a mayhem lasting for a week. On 9 September the Governor Rey surrendered the citadel, and the garrison, reduced to one-third of their number, marched out with the honours of war. The reduction of this important place cost the British three thousand eight hundred men in killed and wounded. A candle-lit memorial event is held nowadays every 31 August, mourning these tragic days.

At the crossing of the Bidasoa separating France and Spain, General Graham commanded the left wing of the British army, and, after an obstinate conflict, succeeded in establishing his troops on French territory. However, the return of the complaint in his eyes, and the general state of his health, obliged him to resign his command and return home. In return for his services, for the third received the thanks of Parliament, and the freedom of the cities of London and Edinburgh was conferred upon him.

1814

His eyes and general health recovered and in 1814 he was able to take the command of the British forces in the Netherlands, during which period he successfully supported Bülow's attack on Hoogstraten. On 8March Graham's attempt to carry the strong fortress of Bergen op Zoom by a night attack ended in failure. In his dispatch to Downing Street he wrote:
"My Lord, It becomes my painful task to report to your Lordship, that an attack on Bergen-op Zoom, which seemed at first to promise complete success, ended in failure, and occasioned a severe loss to the 1st Division, and to Brigadier-General Gore's brigade. It is unnecessary for me to state the reasons which determined me to make the attempt to carry such a place by storm, since the success of two of the columns, in establishing themselves on the ramparts, with very trifling loss, must justify the having inclined the risk for the attainment of so important an object, as the capture of such a fortress."

Later life

On 3May 1814, he was raised to the peerage with the title of Baron Lynedoch of Balgowan in the County of Perth, but, in keeping with his disinterested and high-minded character, he declined the grant of £2,000 a year, to himself and to his heirs, which was voted as usual to accompany the title. British and foreign honours followed: a Knight Grand Cross of the Order of St. Michael and St. George, of the Spanish Order of St. Ferdinand, and of the Portuguese Order of the Tower and Sword. He was raised to the full rank of general in 1821 and nominated colonel of the 58th Foot in 1823, followed by the 14th Foot in 1826, which he exchanged in 1834 for the colonelcy of the Royals. He was elected Rector of the University of Glasgow in 1813, and in 1829 appointed Governor of Dumbarton Castle.

He was noted for his vigour in his old age. He travelled frequently, visiting Italy, Germany, France, Denmark, Sweden, and Russia. In 1841, aged 94, he travelled through France to Genoa and Rome. His riding-horses were sent on to Rome, and he rode frequently in the Campagna. He died at his London home in Stratton Street on 18 December 1843, aged 95, after a very short illness: he rose and dressed himself on the day of his death. He was buried near his family home in a large and specially commissioned stone vault in Methven churchyard.

The barony of Lynedoch died with him.

Bessie Bell and Mary Gray

In 1645, Bessie Bell, daughter of the Laird of Kinvaid, was on a visit to Mary Gray, at her father's house at Lednock, now called Lynedoch, when the plague broke out in the country. Taking alarm at the report, the two young ladies, in order to avoid the deadly infection, set to work and built themselves a bower, which they "theekit wi' rashes" according to the ballad, in a very retired and romantic spot known as the Burn Braes, about three-quarters of a mile west from Lynedoch House. Here they lived in safety for some time, whilst the plague raged with great fury. But, ultimately, they caught the infection from a young gentleman of Perth, who, it is said, was in love with the one or the other. According to custom in cases of plague, the bodies did not receive the ordinary form of sepulture. It seems that they were allowed to lie in the open and "beik fornenst the sun", as the ballad avers, until the flesh had disappeared and only the bone skeletons remained, when these were taken with safety and put beneath the green sod of the Dronach-haugh, at the foot of the brae of the same name, and near to the bank of the river Almond.

After the Lynedoch estate passed into Graham's possession in 1787, on his return from a pilgrimage abroad he found that the wall erected round the graves by Major Barry half a century before had fallen into a dilapidated state. He had the remains of the wall removed and a neat stone parapet and iron railings, 5 feet high, placed round the spot and covered the graves with a stone slab, on which was inscribed the words, "They lived, they loved, they died".

References in popular culture

The names of Lyndoch township and the Barossa Valley in South Australia are derived from "Lynedoch Vale" and the "Barrosa Ranges", named by Colonel William Light, Surveyor General of South Australia, in December 1837 in recognition of his esteemed friend, Lord Lynedoch, who was his commander at the Battle of Barrosa. Both names were mis-spelt on early maps, resulting in the unique names Lyndoch and Barossa.

Graham has a house named after him at the English Private school Wellington College.

Graham is portrayed as a major character in Bernard Cornwell's Sharpe's Fury published in 2006. Cornwell portrays him as an affable Scottish patriot, who lends assistance to fictional hero Richard Sharpe throughout the novel.

He was fictionally represented by name in Patrick Graham's Bollywood television series Betaal (2020). He was shown as being a practitioner of black magic in the series. In it, he raises his Zombie Army of the fictionally taken regiment of 90th Taunton Volunteers after 160 years. The regiment storms centuries-old barracks and fights a fictional state force ultimately to protect their land from outsiders. In the starting prelims of the first episode it shows a backscript as — 17 June 1857 "The Journal of Colonel Lynedoch" reads: "We came to help these people but they resist. The mutiny has reached us. How dare they? I will use their own guardians against them. I will harness the Betaal's curse and grind these savages into the dirt. It seems there are rebels in the tunnel. I must go...." As to display the anger of the Colonel against the mutineers in the 1857 rebellion of which the Colonel and his regiment had become a victim.

See also
 was a merchant vessel launched in 1814 at Calcutta. After she sailed to England she made one voyage for the British East India Company (EIC). Between 1831 and 1841 she made five voyages transporting convicts to Australia, three to Hobart and two to Sydney. She became a transport and suffered a maritime incident in 1844. She was last listed in 1847.

Arms

Notes

References
Grant, Philip R (2019), A Peer Among Princes - The Life of Thomas Graham, Victor of Barrosa, Hero of the Peninsular War, Pen and Sword 2019, 
 

 

Attribution:

Further reading

External links

|-

|-

|-

|-

1748 births
1843 deaths
Barons in the Peerage of the United Kingdom
Peers of the United Kingdom created by George III
British Army generals
British Army personnel of the French Revolutionary Wars
British Army commanders of the Napoleonic Wars
Rectors of the University of Glasgow
Knights Grand Cross of the Order of St Michael and St George
Knights Grand Cross of the Order of the Bath
Cameronians officers
Royal Scots officers
Members of the Parliament of Great Britain for Scottish constituencies
British MPs 1790–1796
British MPs 1796–1800
Members of the Parliament of the United Kingdom for Scottish constituencies
UK MPs 1801–1802
UK MPs 1802–1806
UK MPs 1806–1807
UK MPs who were granted peerages
Alumni of Christ Church, Oxford